Dunbar Loop is a major transit exchange located in the Dunbar–Southlands neighbourhood of Vancouver, British Columbia, Canada. It opened on May 22, 1950, and is the westernmost exchange in the City of Vancouver.

Dunbar Loop can accommodate both diesel and trolley buses of various lengths, including articulated buses. It is part of the TransLink system and also acts as a power station for trolleys.

Structure and location
Dunbar Loop is located at the intersection of Dunbar Street and West 41st Avenue in the Dunbar–Southlands neighbourhood of Vancouver. The majority of the services at this exchange load and unload at Dunbar Street or 41st Avenue, while 2 services (2 and N22) load and unload inside the loop.

Because of its proximity to the University of British Columbia (UBC) and the University Endowment Lands, it is heavily used by students. All routes going westbound from Dunbar Loop terminate at UBC during regular weekday hours.

Routes

References

External links

Dunbar Loop map (PDF file)
Route 49 Service upgrades in June 2016
Route 49 Service upgrades in September 2016
Route 43 Service upgrades in September 2017

TransLink (British Columbia) bus stations